Ashtonfield is a suburb in the City of Maitland, New South Wales, Australia.  It is the location of Ashtonfield Public School, est. in 2007 and the recently upgraded Stockland Greenhills. A new hospital, New Maitland Hospital is near completion near Goodguys & 7 Eleven Garage is now open to service new traffic expected. (September 2021).

Population
According to the 2016 census of Population, there were 4,645 people in Ashtonfield.
 Aboriginal and Torres Strait Islander people made up 3.1% of the population. 
 84.5% of people were born in Australia and 88.1% of people only spoke English at home. 
 The most common responses for religion were Anglican 24.7%, Catholic 24.0% and No Religion 22.7%.

Bloomfield Colliery 
Bloomfield is a mine located in Ashtonfield which is still currently still operating.

Trivia
 Gigabit Internet

 Stockland Greenhills is close by

 council recently put up new signage

References

Suburbs of Maitland, New South Wales